The Barton Mystery may refer to:

 The Barton Mystery (play), a play by Walter C. Hackett
 The Barton Mystery (1920 film), a British silent film directed by Harry T. Roberts 
 The Barton Mystery (1932 film), a British film directed by Henry Edwards
 The Barton Mystery (1949 film), a French film directed by Charles Spaak